Submarine is the debut album by the Irish rock group Whipping Boy, released in July 1992 on the Liquid Records label.

Track listing
"Safari"
"Beatle"
"Sushi"
"Favorite Sister"
"Astronaut Blues"
"Bettyclean"
"Buffalo"
"Snow"
"Valentine 69"
"Submarine"

Personnel 
 Colm Hassett - drums & bottles
 Myles McDonnell - bass & "kazzoo"
 Paul Page - Guitar & "Lost in space vocals"
 Ferghal E. McKee - vocals

References

External links
Discography page on official website

1992 albums
Whipping Boy (Irish band) albums